Thomas Mayson (8 December 1886 – 1972) was an English professional footballer who played as an inside forward.

References

1886 births
1972 deaths
Sportspeople from Whitehaven
English footballers
Association football inside forwards
Burnley F.C. players
Grimsby Town F.C. players
Everton F.C. players
Pontypridd F.C. players
Wolverhampton Wanderers F.C. players
Aberdare Athletic F.C. players
English Football League players
Footballers from Cumbria